The 1990–91 Czechoslovak Extraliga season was the 48th season of the Czechoslovak Extraliga, the top level of ice hockey in Czechoslovakia. 14 teams participated in the league, and Dukla Jihlava won the championship.

Regular season

Playoffs

Semifinal 
Dukla Jihlava – VSŽ Košice 8:4 (2:2,3:1,3:1)
Dukla Jihlava – VSŽ Košice 7:0 (1:0,2:0,4:0)
VSŽ Košice – Dukla Jihlava 3:4 (0:1,1:0,2:3)
Dukla Trenčín – HC CHZ Litvínov 3:5 (0:1,2:2,1:2)
Dukla Trenčín – HC CHZ Litvínov 4:1 (1:1,3:0,0:0)
HC CHZ Litvínov – Dukla Trenčín 4:3 SN (2:0,0:2,1:1,0:0)
HC CHZ Litvínov – Dukla Trenčín 6:5 PP (2:3,1:2,2:0,1:0)

Final 
Dukla Jihlava – HC CHZ Litvínov 6:3 (4:2,1:0,1:1)
Dukla Jihlava – HC CHZ Litvínov 3:2 (2:0,1:2,0:0)
HC CHZ Litvínov – Dukla Jihlava 5:1 (2:1,1:0,2:0)
HC CHZ Litvínov – Dukla Jihlava 0:7 (0:5,0:1,0:1)

3rd place 
Dukla Trenčín – VSŽ Košice 6:4 (1:1,3:0,2:3)
Dukla Trenčín – VSŽ Košice 4:2 (0:0,2:1,2:1)

External links
History of Czechoslovak ice hockey

Czechoslovak Extraliga seasons
Czechoslovak
1990–91 in Czechoslovak ice hockey